Peter Holder may refer to:

 Peter Holder (journalist) (born 1964), Australian journalist and publisher
 Peter Holder (organist) (born 1990), British organist